Malcolm Julian "Mannie" McArthur (30 July 1882 – 6 July 1961) was an Australian rugby union national representative rugby union player. He won a gold medal in rugby at the 1908 Summer Olympics.

Rugby career
McArthur's rugby career was played with the Eastern Suburbs RUFC in Sydney, Australia. He was selected in Australia's inaugural national rugby team to tour the northern hemisphere - Dr Paddy Moran's First Wallabies for the 1908–09 Australia rugby union tour of Britain.

At the time the rugby tournament for the London Olympics game may not have appeared to be of great significance. Australia had already beaten Cornwall, the British county champions early in the tour and Scotland, Ireland and France had all turned down the Rugby Football Union's invitation to participate in the Olympic bouts. Neither the tour captain Moran, nor the vice-captain Fred Wood played, so Chris McKivat led the Wallabies to an easy 32–3 victory and to Olympic glory, with each Wallaby in that match thereafter an Olympic gold medallist.

McArthur made his Test debut on that tour at Rectory Field, Blackheath in the Test against England in January 1909 - a match won by Australia 9–3.

See also
 Rugby union at the 1908 Summer Olympics

Footnotes

External links
 
 
 

1882 births
1961 deaths
Australian rugby union players
Australia international rugby union players
Rugby union players at the 1908 Summer Olympics
Olympic rugby union players of Australasia
Olympic gold medalists for Australasia
Medalists at the 1908 Summer Olympics
Rugby union players from Sydney
Rugby union flankers